Abeh-ye Golha (also Romanized as Ābeh-ye Golhā; also known as Golhā) is a village in Nezamabad Rural District, in the Central District of Azadshahr County, Golestan Province, Iran. At the 2006 census, its population was 406, in 105 families.

References 

Populated places in Azadshahr County